The Michigan Stones(last name of the team when they moved to Saginaw, Michigan), originally titled the Flint Stones(based in Flint), was a cacelled basketball team that was supposed to be a professional basketball team in Flint, Michigan as a member of the International Basketball League in the year 2000, but due to a lack of cooperation between the league and team ownership, the Stones folded before the 2000 season began.

Owner and crew
The team was owned by businessman Bill McCrary.General Manager(GM) was Carl Hamilton, (formerly Flint's Director of Park's and Rec.). Head Coach was Johnny Golston (deceased) (Detroit Pershing's High coach of several High School state championship teams). Assistant Coach was Justice Thigman (the first Flint player in the NBA-Detroit).

Background story
Pistons were expected to be a professional basketball team in Flint, Michigan as a member of the International Basketball League. The Michigan Stones folded before their first season began because the city's IMA Arena was made unavailable by Mayor Woodrow Stanley, who had his own intentions of operating a team, which never got off the ground, and the team's lack of cooperation by the league ownership, in Baltimore, who later folded the league, which resulted in the team owners losing all its investment and left the Stones without a league.

References

External links
  A Scaled-Back IBL Tries to Launch Another Season
  Flint Star Motion Picture

Sports in Flint, Michigan
Basketball teams in Michigan